Dan Naveh (born 21 June 1960) is an Israeli businessman and former politician. He served as a member of the Knesset for Likud between 1999 and 2007 and as a government minister from 2001 until 2006. He is the founder and the managing general partner of Agate Medical Investments, served for seven years as the chairman of Clal insurance, and is currently president and CEO of Israel Bonds.

Biography
Born Dan Mannheim in Bnei Brak, Naveh studied at Yeshivat Netiv Meir in Jerusalem. In 1985 he graduated from the Hebrew University of Jerusalem with an LLB, and was admitted to the bar in 1986.

Political and media career
Naveh was an adviser to Minister Moshe Arens between 1986 and 1992 while Arens was a Minister without Portfolio (1986–87), Minister of Foreign Affairs (1988–90) and Minister of Defense (1990–92). After working with Arens, he was appointed editor of foreign news at the Haaretz newspaper. He then served as Cabinet Secretary from 1996 until 1999, a role in which he chaired the Israeli Steering Committee for the negotiations with the Palestinians, playing a central role in the Wye River Memorandum and the Hebron Protocol.

Naveh was elected to the Knesset on the Likud list in 1999. In 2001 new Prime Minister Ariel Sharon appointed him Minister in the Prime Minister's Office in the twenty-ninth government, in which capacity he acted as a liaison between the government and the Knesset. After being re-elected in 2003 he was appointed Health Minister in the new government. Naveh resigned from the government on 14 January 2006, along with the rest of the Likud members. He was re-elected in the 2006 elections, but resigned on 25 February 2007 and was replaced by Yuli-Yoel Edelstein. During his time in the Knesset he also served on the Foreign Affairs and Defense Committee, the Constitution, Law and Justice Committee, and Committee on the Rights of Children, as well as heading the Parliamentary Lobby for the Israeli MIAs.

Business career
Following his departure from politics, Naveh founded Health Care Venture Capital Group, which included three funds focused on MedTech and health care. In June 2013 he was appointed chairman of directors of Clal Insurance, a role he held until 2020. In May 2021 he founded Sure-Tech investments, a public partnership with a focus on investing in the fields of Insurtech and Fintech. In December 2021 he became president and CEO of the Israel Bonds, starting a five-year term.

Personal life
Naveh is married to Tsili and the father of three children, Itay, Ilay and Yael.

Published works
Dan Naveh, Government Secrets, Yediot Aharonot publishing

External links

Agate Medical Investments

1960 births
People from Bnei Brak
Hebrew University of Jerusalem Faculty of Law alumni
Living people
Likud politicians
Ministers of Health of Israel
Members of the 15th Knesset (1999–2003)
Members of the 16th Knesset (2003–2006)
Members of the 17th Knesset (2006–2009)